Dongfeng Subdistrict is a subdistrict of Qiaodong District, in the heart of Shijiazhuang, Hebei, People's Republic of China. , it has 5 residential communities under its administration.

See also
List of township-level divisions of Hebei

References

Township-level divisions of Hebei